The ISCAE (Institut supérieur de commerce et d'administration des entreprises) is a business school in Casablanca and Rabat, Morocco and in Conakry, Guinea. It was founded in 1971 by King Hassan II to improve business education in Morocco.

Programmes

Cycle Grande Ecole
The Cycle Grande Ecole is a three-year programme which delivers a master's degree in 3 different fields ; 
 Corporate finance
 Audit
 Marketing

Executive MBA 
The ISCAE Executive MBA is a part-time programme which was substituted for the former Cycle Superieur de Gestion.

Chartered Professional Accountancy program 
The ISCAE CPA Programm in collaboration with Association of Chartered Accountants (O.E.C Ordre des Experts Comptables)

References

External links
ISCAE official website
ISCAE Alumni website

Business schools in Morocco
Schools in Casablanca
Organizations based in Casablanca
Educational institutions established in 1971
1971 establishments in Morocco
20th-century architecture in Morocco